Richard Groschopp (19 February 1906 - 8 July 1996) was a German film director and screenwriter. He directed in more than sixty films from 1932 to 1971.

Selected filmography

References

External links 

1906 births
1996 deaths
Film people from Thuringia
People from Sömmerda (district)